Until statehood in 1912, Arizona Territory was represented in the United States House of Representatives by a non-voting delegate.

List of delegates representing the district

References

External links 
 
 
 
 

Congressional district
Territory
At-large United States congressional districts
Former congressional districts of the United States
Constituencies established in 1864
1864 establishments in Arizona Territory
Constituencies disestablished in 1912
1912 disestablishments in Arizona Territory